Already may refer to:

Albums
 Already (Jesus Jones album), 1997
 Already (Edison Lighthouse album), 1971

Songs
 "Already" (song), 2019 song by Beyoncé, Shatta Wale and Major Lazer
 "Already", 2009 song by Mannie Fresh on his album Return of the Ballin'
 "Already", 2011 song by Freddie Gibbs on his album Lord Giveth, Lord Taketh Away
 "Already", 2011 song by Samiyam on his album Sam Baker's Album
 "Already", 2013 song by Gucci Mane on his mixtape Trap House 4
 "Already", 2014 song by Anderson Paak on his album Venice
 "Already", 2014 song by Chief Keef on his album Nobody